San Martín de Bolaños is a town and municipality, in Jalisco in central-western Mexico. The municipality covers an area of 991.99 km².

As of 2005, the municipality had a total population of 3,205.

References

Municipalities of Jalisco